The Treaty of Huế was signed on April 14, 1863 between representatives of Đại Nam and the French Empire. Based on the terms of the accord, three Vietnamese ports were opened (Đà Nẵng,  and Quảng Yên). Moreover, freedom of missionary activity was permitted and Vietnam's foreign affairs were under French imperial protection. Saigon, seized by the French in 1862, was declared the capital of French Cochinchina. Overall, the treaty confirmed the tenets of the First Treaty of Saigon.

See also
Imperialism in Asia
List of treaties

External links 
André Adolphe-Eugène Disdéri - An Annamite Ambassador 1863 

 

1863 in France
1863 in Vietnam
1863 treaties
Hue (1863)
Hue (1863)
France–Vietnam relations
French Indochina
1863 in the French colonial empire